Willow Creek State Recreation Area (SRA) is a state park in northeastern Nebraska, United States. The recreation area is managed by the Nebraska Game and Parks Commission.

The area is popular for boating, fishing, camping, and swimming. The reservoir is stocked with crappie, bluegill, bass, catfish, walleye, and northern pike. There are 101 RV campsites with electrical hookups and an equestrian campground with 10 campsites. There is a 10 mile long hiking and biking trail.

See also
Nebraska Game and Parks Commission

References

External links
 Willow Creek State Recreation Area
 Nebraska Game and Parks Commission

Protected areas of Nebraska
State parks of Nebraska